Joaquín Barro (born 9 March 2001) is an Argentine professional footballer who plays as a centre-back for Gimnasia y Esgrima de Jujuy.

Career
Barro's career started with Gimnasia y Esgrima. After being moved into Carlos Morales Santos' senior squad during the 2016–17 Primera B Nacional campaign, Barro was selected for his professional debut on 30 July 2017 during a victory away to Crucero del Norte. That was the defender's only appearance in a season which Gimnasia y Esgrima finished eighteenth. In January 2018, Barro was signed on loan by Argentine Primera División side Talleres.

Career statistics
.

References

External links

2001 births
Living people
Sportspeople from Jujuy Province
Argentine footballers
Association football defenders
Primera Nacional players
Gimnasia y Esgrima de Jujuy footballers
Talleres de Córdoba footballers